Laurence R. Helfer (born 1965) is an American lawyer.

Helfer graduated from Yale University before pursuing legal studies at the New York University School of Law. He also completed a master's in public administration from Princeton University. Helfer clerked for Dolores Sloviter and practiced law at Rabinowitz, Boudin, Standard, Krinksy & Lieberman, a firm in New York. He has taught at the University of Toronto Faculty of Law, the University of Chicago Law School, Harvard Law School, Loyola Law School, Princeton University, and Vanderbilt University Law School. From 2009, Helfer has taught at Duke University School of Law as Harry R. Chadwick, Sr. Distinguished Professor of Law. 

In 2022, Helfer was elected to serve on the UN Human Rights Committee as the representative for the United States until 2026.

Selected books

References

1965 births
Living people
21st-century American male writers
New York University School of Law alumni
Princeton School of Public and International Affairs alumni
Yale University alumni
Academic staff of the University of Toronto Faculty of Law
Vanderbilt University Law School faculty
Princeton University faculty
University of Chicago Law School faculty
Loyola Law School faculty
Harvard Law School faculty
New York (state) lawyers
20th-century American lawyers
21st-century American lawyers